Ab Barik-e Olya (also Romanized as Āb Bārīk-e ‘Olyā and Āb Bārīk ‘Olyā; also known as Āb Bārīk Bālā and Āb Bārīk-e Bālā) is a village in Borborud-e Sharqi Rural District, in the Central District of Aligudarz County, Lorestan Province, Iran. At the 2006 census, its population was 320 in 57 families.

References 

Towns and villages in Aligudarz County